The Vardar Corps was a corps of the Yugoslav Army in the Homeland (JVuO) that operated on the left bank of the river Vardar during the World War II in Yugoslavia on the territory of modern-day North Macedonia and southern Serbia. Its commander was former Captain of the Royal Guard of the Royal Yugoslav Army Stojan Krstić. It consisted of four brigades with total number of 1,000 soldiers. Together with Jablanica Corps, South Morava Corps and Flying Corps it belonged under Mountain Staff 110 located in Sijarinska Banja which was responsible for the territory of Southern Serbia (which included the territory of contemporary North Macedonia). The four brigades were components of this Corps:
 Kumanovo (or Žegligovo) Brigade
 Ristovac Brigade
 Preševo Brigade
 Kriva Palanka Brigade

The commander of Kumanovo Brigade was Lieutenant Nikola Janjićijević. Dragutin Keserović reported to Mihailović that the British mission at Vardar Corps HQ, headed by Captain Pervis, aborted their mission and left Chetniks on 20 December 1943, on the same day when the British mission with Toplica Corps headed by Captain Scott left its HQ.

The territory in which this Corps operated was triangle between Gnjilane, Vranje and Veles which belonged to the former Yugoslav counties of Preševo, Kriva Palanka, Kumanovo, Ovče Polje and Skoplje.

The Vardar Corps was destroyed by Partisan units from Macedonia and Serbia at the beginning of March 1944.

References

Sources 

 
 
 
 
 
 

Military units and formations of the Chetniks in World War II
Military units and formations disestablished in 1944